Laraine Herring (born 1968) is an American writer of both novels and nonfiction books. Laraine's poetry, fiction, and essays have appeared in various anthologies and magazines, including Midnight Mind and Walking the Twilight: Women Writers of the Southwest. She was awarded the Barbara Deming Memorial Fund grant for her fiction, and her non-fiction has been nominated for a Pushcart Prize.

Early life and education
Herring holds a BA from the University of Arizona, an MFA in Creative Writing/Fiction from Antioch University, and an MA in Counseling Psychology from Prescott College.

Career
Herring was listed in the Arizona Artists Roster in Creative Writing from  2001 to 2010. She has taught at universities, libraries, community centers, and writing conferences around the country, as well as at the Kripalu Center for Yoga and Health and Omega Institute for Holistic Studies.

Herring was Writer in Residence at Soapstone Retreat in 2003.

Herring was a presenter at Hassayampa Institute for Creative Writing from 2005 to 2007. She was a Phoenix College Creative Writing Microburst Panelist in 2006, and she was Writer in Residence at Eastern Arizona College in 2008.

Currently, she directs the Creative Writing Program at Yavapai College in Prescott, Arizona, and works as a consultant for Tracking Wonder in New York.

Books 
 On Being Stuck: Tapping into the Creative Power of Writer's Block, May, 2016, Shambhala Publications
 Into the Garden of Gethsemane, Georgia, 2013, The Concentrium, 2013
 Gathering Lights: A Novel of San Francisco, 2013 , The Concentrium
 Ghost Swamp Blues: A Novel, 2010, White River Press
 The Writing Warrior: Discovering the Courage to Free Your True Voice, 2010, Shambhala Publications
 Writing Begins with the Breath: Embodying Your Authentic Voice, 2007, Shambhala Publications
 Lost Fathers: How Women Can Heal from Adolescent Father Loss, 2005, Hazelden Press
 Monsoons: A Collection of Writing, 1999, Duality Press

Anthologies 

Laraine Herring's work has appeared in the following Anthologies:
 Women Celebrate Peace Publications

Productions 

Laraine Herring's work has been featured in the following Productions:
 She Rhythms; (contributing author) produced by Big Damn Deal Productions
 Hosanna in the Highest; produced by Big Damn Deal Productions
 Witch Holiday; produced by Planet Earth Multicultural Theatre
 Earthquakes; (contributing author) – Public Cable Access, award-winning program
 A Sick & Twisted Christmas; (contributing author) produced by Planet Earth Theatre
 Nothing's Black & White But Zebras; produced by Planet Earth Multicultural Theatre
 Liberating Mama; produced by Planet Earth Multicultural Theatre
 The Resurrection Quilt; produced by Playwright's Workshop Theatre
 Voices on the Edge; (contributing author) produced by Playwright's Workshop Theatre (Zony nomination, Best Original Work)
 Over the Edge; (contributing author) produced by Playwright's Workshop Theatre

Honors 
 Phoenix Downtown Magazine, 1st prize, poetry
 Tempe Poetry in April, 2003
 i.e. magazine, 1st prize, short fiction, 2002
 Pushcart Prize nomination, 2002, creative non-fiction piece appearing in “Midnight Mind”
 Barbara Deming Award for Women Grant, 2001, for fiction

References

External links 
 
 Shambhala Publications Author Page
 Works by or about Laraine Herring in libraries ( in WorldCat catalog)
 Degrees and Certificates – Creative Writing Certificate
 Laraine Herring | Author | Red Room

1968 births
Living people
American women novelists
American non-fiction writers
University of Arizona alumni
Antioch University alumni
Prescott College alumni
American women non-fiction writers
21st-century American women